Kappeln-Land is an Amt ("collective municipality") in the district of Schleswig-Flensburg, in Schleswig-Holstein, Germany. It is situated on the north bank of the Schlei, around Kappeln, which is the seat of the Amt, but not part of it.

The Amt Kappeln-Land consists of the following municipalities (population in 2005 between brackets):

Arnis (313) 
Grödersby (270) 
Oersberg (337) 
Rabenkirchen-Faulück (673)

References

Ämter in Schleswig-Holstein